Malacomyia is a genus of kelp flies in the family Coelopidae.

Species
Malacomyia sciomyzina (Haliday, 1833)

References

Coelopidae
Sciomyzoidea genera